Robič is a settlement below Mount Matajur on the left bank of the Nadiža River in the Municipality of Kobarid in the Littoral region of Slovenia.

Notable people
Notable people that were born or lived in Robič include:
Ivan Urbančič (1930–2016), philosopher

Gallery

References

External links
Robič on Geopedia

Populated places in the Municipality of Kobarid